William Henry Lancaster (November 17, 1947 – January 4, 1997) was an American screenwriter and actor.

Early life
He was born November 17, 1947, in Los Angeles, California, the son of Burt Lancaster (1913–1994) and Norma Anderson (1917–1988). He contracted polio at an early age, leaving one leg shorter than the other.

Career
Lancaster, a look-alike for his famous father at the time, guest-starred in an episode of the television series The Big Valley in 1967. Lancaster played the role of "King", the boyfriend of a murdered college coed in The Midnight Man (1974), a mystery film starring and co-directed by his father.
 
Lancaster's best-known work is his adapted screenplay for John Carpenter's The Thing. He also penned the original screenplays for two of The Bad News Bears films.

In 1982, he worked on a first-draft script of an adaptation of Stephen King's novel Firestarter for Carpenter to direct. Months later of the same year, Carpenter hired Bill Phillips to work on a rewrite of Lancaster's draft. When The Thing did not match the studio's financial expectations, Universal replaced Carpenter with Mark L. Lester and both drafts were scrapped in favor of Stanley Mann's draft.

Lancaster is featured in the documentary The Thing: Terror Takes Shape, found on the collector's edition DVD of The Thing. Lancaster states that he did not think Who Goes There? was a "great" story, but that he responded to the tale's sense of claustrophobia and paranoia. The documentary is dedicated to him.

Personal life
Lancaster was married to Kippie Kovacs, daughter of the comedian Ernie Kovacs. They had one child, daughter Keigh Kristin.

Death
Lancaster died of a heart attack at the age of 49. His ashes were buried at Westwood Village Memorial Park Cemetery, where his father's ashes are also interred. The ashes of his daughter Keigh, who died in 2017 at age 51, were buried with her father's in the same plot.

Filmography

Screenplays
The Bad News Bears (1976)
The Bad News Bears Go to Japan (1978) (Also co-producer)
The Thing (1982)
Firestarter (1984) (earlier unused screenplay)

Acting
The Big Valley (1967) – Second Boy
Moses the Lawgiver (1974, TV Mini-Series) – Young Moses
The Midnight Man (1974) – King

References

External links
 
 

1947 births
1997 deaths
American male screenwriters
Writers from Los Angeles
Male actors from Greater Los Angeles
20th-century American male actors
Burials at Westwood Village Memorial Park Cemetery
Screenwriters from California
20th-century American male writers
20th-century American screenwriters